The Paltus-class submarine is a Russian special purpose mini-submarine of project 1851.1. Two boats were completed - AS-21 and AS-35 as a follow up of the single "X-Ray"-class boat AS-23 (Project 1851). They are both part of the 29th special submarine squadron at Olenya Guba.

The designer, according to Polmar was Sergei Bavilin who had designed the earlier diesel electric Project 865/Piranya small submarine of similar dimensions.

See also
 List of submarine classes in service

References

Submarine classes
Submarines of Russia